Əniqoba (also, Anykhoba and Anykhoba Pervaya) is a village and municipality in the Qusar Rayon of Azerbaijan.  It has a population of 737.  The municipality consists of the villages of Əniqoba and Xuluqoba.

References 

Populated places in Qusar District